In geometry, an affine-regular polygon or affinely regular polygon is a polygon that is related to a regular polygon by an affine transformation. Affine transformations include translations, uniform and non-uniform scaling, reflections, rotations, shears, and other similarities and some, but not all linear maps.

Examples
All triangles are affine-regular. In other words, all triangles can be generated by applying affine transformations to an equilateral triangle. A quadrilateral is affine-regular if and only if it is a parallelogram, which includes rectangles and rhombuses as well as squares. In fact, affine-regular polygons may be considered a natural generalization of parallelograms.

Properties
Many properties of regular polygons are invariant under affine transformations, and affine-regular polygons share the same properties. For instance,
an affine-regular quadrilateral can be equidissected into  equal-area triangles if and only if  is even, by affine invariance of equidissection and Monsky's theorem on equidissections of squares.

References

Affine geometry
Types of polygons